Trachypepla angularis is a species of moth in the family Oecophoridae. It is endemic to New Zealand and has been collected at Lake Rotoroa in the Nelson Lakes National Park in January. This species inhabits mixed native forest.

Taxonomy 
This species was first described in 1929 by Alfred Philpott and named Borkhausenia angularis using specimens collected at the foot of Lake Rotoroa in January. In 1939 this species was discussed and illustrated by George Hudson in his book A supplement to the butterflies and moths of New Zealand. In 1988 J. S. Dugdale placed this species in the genus Trachypepla. Dugdale justified this placement saying "the basally strongly arcuate aedeagus and the valval character of angularis accord well with Trachypepla species as figured by Philpott". This placement was confirmed in 2010 by Robert Hoare. The male holotype specimen, collected at Lake Rotoroa by Philpott, is held at the New Zealand Arthropod Collection.

Description

Philpott described the adults of this species as follows:
Philpott stated that this species was similar in appearance to Tingena seclusa but that T. angularis has more prominent and different markings on its forewings.

Distribution 

This species is endemic to New Zealand and has been collected in the Nelson lakes area.

Habitat
T. angularis has been observed in mixed native forest.

Behaviour
Adults of this species are on the wing in January.

References 

Moths described in 1929
Oecophorinae
Moths of New Zealand
Endemic fauna of New Zealand
Taxa named by Alfred Philpott
Endemic moths of New Zealand